Oceania Broadcasting Network (also known as OBN, or by its call letters A3M-TV 7) Began  operating in 1991.

Opening
OBN was officially opened by King Taufa'ahau Tupou IV on September 29, 1991. It was the second TV station broadcasting in NTSC to operate in the Kingdom, initially running in direct competition against rival Tongan TV channel ASTL TV3, before the latter ceased operations in 1993.

Building
The building station was licensed to was supposedly leased by a unit of the Church of Jesus Christ of Latter-day Saints.  After their property lease was cut short by the King, the Mormons were forced to relocate to Liahona. The building was then leased to a Chinese entrepreneur, who set up the Tong-Hua Chinese Restaurant. Tong-Hua inhabited the building for almost ten years, until they were also forced to relocate when the king granted a lifetime lease to TV 7. The original TV tower was attached to the part of the building where the spire once stood.

Christian influence
OBN started primarily as a Christian station, but later, at the king's request, expanded its programming to include other genres, such as news, sport and general entertainment.

Christian programming broadcast on a regular basis included: 
Billy Graham Ministries
Hillsong Television
In Touch
700 Club International

Additional channels
In 1998, OBN expanded its operations with the upgrade of its studio facilities, the installation of two giant satellite dishes and a new tower, the tallest in Tonga. Three additional free-to-air channels were also opened to the viewing public, Channel 8 (a PAL version of Channel 7), Channel 9 (broadcasting CNN, and later BBC World & Fox News in NTSC), and Channel 10 (a PAL version of Channel 9). This is when the company started emphasising the OBN moniker, as opposed to TV 7. However, the station is perhaps still best known (and more popularly referred to) among viewers as TV 7. In 2000, OBN ceased to operate Channel 9, after the Tongan government revoked OBN's license for that frequency. The government then allocated Channel 9 for its own television station, TV Tonga. OBN later dropped Channel 10, broadcasting on Channels 7(NTSC) & 8(PAL) only.

Influence in Tongan politics
While originally distancing itself from Tongan politics, OBN seemed to change its stance when it went commercial. With the pro-government TV Tonga's outright refusal to air any program supporting the Human Rights and Democracy Movement during the 2005 civil servants' strike, OBN became an outlet for the voice of the strikers allowing a moral balanced and open freedom of speech unlike the government controlled station.  Silenced by government in 2006 in an attempt to control the media in Tonga, the station is due to commence programming again in March, 2009.

Local programs produced at OBN
Check it Out!
Good Morning Tonga
OBN Tonga News
Pole 'o e Kuonga
Stars on Sunday
Tala 'o Tonga

External links 
 Open Encyclopedia: Tonga Publications and Media
 Tonga on the Net - News Media in Tonga
 Matangi Tonga article: Tonga's television news expands
 Pacific Islands report: Events leading up to Tonga riot

Television stations in Tonga